Alphacrambus is a grass moth genus (family Crambidae) of subfamily Crambinae, tribe Crambini. Some authors have placed it in the snout moth family (Pyralidae), where all grass moths were once also included, but this seems to be in error.

Species
Alphacrambus cristatus Bassi, 1995
Alphacrambus parvus Bassi, 1995
Alphacrambus phoeostrigellus (Hampson, 1903)
Alphacrambus prodontellus (Hampson, 1919)
Alphacrambus razowskii (Bleszynski, 1961)

References

Crambini
Crambidae genera